TV 1872 Saarlouis is a German sports club from Saarlouis best known for its women's basketball team, also known as Saarlouis Royals. Royals won two national leagues and three national cups between 2008 and 2010, and reached the 2010 Eurocup's semifinals. However, the team collapsed in 2012, ending last.

Titles
 Bundesliga
 2009, 2010
 BBL-Pokal
 2008, 2009, 2010

2011-12 Roster
 (1.90)  Petra Manaková
 (1.86)  Stefanie Grigoliet
 (1.85)  Katharina Haefele
 (1.83)  Myrthe Beld
 (1.83)  Candace Williams
 (1.82)  Leonie Edringer
 (1.81)  Katharina Muller
 (1.81)  Laura Rahn
 (1.80)  Jamailah Adams
 (1.80)  Joana Meyer
 (1.80)  Tudy Reed
 (1.76)  Megan Pinske
 (1.70)  Sophia Philippi
 (1.68)  Levke Brodersen

References

Women's basketball teams in Germany